Dactyl may refer to:

 Dactyl (mythology), a legendary being
 Dactyl (poetry), a metrical unit of verse
 Dactyl Foundation, an arts organization
 Finger, a part of the hand
 Dactylus, part of a decapod crustacean
 "-dactyl", a suffix used in taxonomy 
 Dactyl (moon), a moon of asteroid 243 Ida